Trinidad High School is a public high school located in Trinidad, Colorado.

History
Trinidad High School was established in 1882.

Athletics

Teams
Trinidad's athletic teams are nicknamed the Miners and the school's colors are Carolina blue, navy, and white. Trinidad teams compete in the following sports: football, volleyball, girls' golf, boys' golf, basketball, track, wrestling, baseball, girls' soccer.

State championships
Football
1956 Colorado AA State Champions
1957 Colorado AA State Champions
1988 Colorado AA State Champions
1989 Colorado AA State Champions
1991 Colorado 4A State Champions
Boys' tennis
1940 Colorado State Champions

Demographics
72% of the student population at Trinidad High School identify as Hispanic, 23% identify as Caucasian, 2% identify as multiracial, 1% identify as American Indian/Alaskin Native, 1% identity as Asian, and 1% identify as African American. The student body makeup is 51% male and 49% female.

References

External links
 Official site

Public high schools in Colorado
Education in Las Animas County, Colorado